The explosive yield of a nuclear weapon is the amount of energy released when that particular nuclear weapon is detonated, usually expressed as a TNT equivalent (the standardized equivalent mass of trinitrotoluene which, if detonated, would produce the same energy discharge), either in kilotonnes (kt—thousands of tonnes of TNT), in megatonnes (Mt—millions of tonnes of TNT), or sometimes in terajoules (TJ). Because the accuracy of any measurement of the energy released by TNT has always been problematic, the conventional definition is that one kilotonne of TNT is held simply to be equivalent to 1012 calories.

The yield-to-weight ratio is the amount of weapon yield compared to the mass of the weapon. The practical maximum yield-to-weight ratio for fusion weapons (thermonuclear weapons) has been estimated to six megatonnes of TNT per tonne of bomb mass (25 TJ/kg). Yields of 5.2 megatonnes/tonne and higher have been reported for large weapons constructed for single-warhead use in the early 1960s. Since then, the smaller warheads needed to achieve the increased net damage efficiency (bomb damage/bomb mass) of multiple warhead systems have resulted in increases in the yield/mass ratio for single modern warheads.

Examples of nuclear weapon yields

In order of increasing yield (most yield figures are approximate):

In comparison, the blast yield of the GBU-43 Massive Ordnance Air Blast bomb is 0.011 kt, and that of the Oklahoma City bombing, using a truck-based fertilizer bomb, was 0.002 kt. The estimated strength of the explosion at the Port of Beirut is 0.3-0.5 kt. Most artificial non-nuclear explosions are considerably smaller than even what are considered to be very small nuclear weapons.

Yield limits
The yield-to-mass ratio is the amount of weapon yield compared to the mass of the weapon. According to nuclear-weapons designer Ted Taylor, the practical maximum yield-to-mass ratio for fusion weapons is about 6 megatonnes of TNT per tonne (25 TJ/kg). The "Taylor limit" is not derived from first principles, and weapons with yields as high as 9.5 megatonnes per tonne have been theorized. The highest achieved values are somewhat lower, and the value tends to be lower for smaller, lighter weapons, of the sort that are emphasized in today's arsenals, designed for efficient MIRV use or delivery by cruise missile systems.

 The 25 Mt yield option reported for the B41 would give it a yield-to-mass ratio of 5.1 megatonnes of TNT per tonne. While this would require a far greater efficiency than any other current U.S. weapon (at least 40% efficiency in a fusion fuel of lithium deuteride), this was apparently attainable, probably by the use of higher than normal lithium-6 enrichment in the lithium deuteride fusion fuel. This results in the B41 still retaining the record for the highest yield-to-mass weapon ever designed.
 The W56 demonstrated a yield-to-mass ratio of 4.96 kt per kilogram of device mass, and very close to the predicted 5.1 kt/kg achievable in the highest yield-to-mass weapon ever built, the 25-megatonne B41. Unlike the B41, which was never proof-tested at full yield, the W56 demonstrated its efficiency in the XW-56X2 Bluestone shot of Operation Dominic in 1962, thus, from information available in the public domain, the W56 may hold the distinction of demonstrating the highest efficiency in a nuclear weapon to date.
 In 1963 DOE declassified statements that the U.S. had the technological capability of deploying a 35 Mt warhead on the Titan II, or a 50–60 Mt gravity bomb on B-52s. Neither weapon was pursued, but either would require yield-to-mass ratios superior to a 25 Mt Mk-41. This may have been achievable by utilizing the same design as the B41 but with the addition of a HEU tamper, in place of the cheaper but lower energy density U-238 tamper, which is the most commonly used tamper material in Teller–Ulam thermonuclear weapons.
 For current smaller US weapons, yield is 600 to 2200 kilotonnes of TNT per tonne. By comparison, for the very small tactical devices such as the Davy Crockett it was 0.4 to 40 kilotonnes of TNT per tonne. For historical comparison, for Little Boy the yield was only 4 kilotonnes of TNT per tonne, and for the largest Tsar Bomba, the yield was 2 megatonnes of TNT per tonne (deliberately reduced from about twice as much yield for the same weapon, so there is little doubt that this bomb as designed was capable of 4 megatonnes per tonne yield).
 The largest pure-fission bomb ever constructed, Ivy King, had a 500 kilotonne yield, which is probably in the range of the upper limit on such designs. Fusion boosting could likely raise the efficiency of such a weapon significantly, but eventually all fission-based weapons have an upper yield limit due to the difficulties of dealing with large critical masses. (The UK's Orange Herald was a very large boosted fission bomb, with a yield of 800 kilotonnes.) However, there is no known upper yield limit for a fusion bomb.

Large single warheads are seldom a part of today's arsenals, since smaller MIRV warheads, spread out over a pancake-shaped destructive area, are far more destructive for a given total yield, or unit of payload mass. This effect results from the fact that destructive power of a single warhead on land scales approximately only as the cube root of its yield, due to blast "wasted" over a roughly hemispherical blast volume, while the strategic target is distributed over a circular land area with limited height and depth. This effect more than makes up for the lessened yield/mass efficiency encountered if ballistic missile warheads are individually scaled down from the maximal size that could be carried by a single-warhead missile.

Milestone nuclear explosions
The following list is of milestone nuclear explosions. In addition to the atomic bombings of Hiroshima and Nagasaki, the first nuclear test of a given weapon type for a country is included, as well as tests that were otherwise notable (such as the largest test ever). All yields (explosive power) are given in their estimated energy equivalents in kilotons of TNT (see TNT equivalent). Putative tests (like Vela incident) have not been included.

Note
 "Staged" refers to whether it was a "true" thermonuclear weapon of the so-called Teller–Ulam configuration or simply a form of a boosted fission weapon. For a more complete list of nuclear test series, see List of nuclear tests. Some exact yield estimates, such as that of the Tsar Bomba and the tests by India and Pakistan in 1998, are somewhat contested among specialists.

Calculating yields and controversy

Yields of nuclear explosions can be very hard to calculate, even using numbers as rough as in the kilotonne or megatonne range (much less down to the resolution of individual terajoules). Even under very controlled conditions, precise yields can be very hard to determine, and for less controlled conditions the margins of error can be quite large. For fission devices, the most precise yield value is found from "radiochemical/Fallout analysis"; that is, measuring the quantity of fission products generated, in much the same way as the chemical yield in chemical reaction products can be measured after a chemical reaction. The radiochemical analysis method was pioneered by Herbert L. Anderson.

For nuclear explosive devices where the fallout is not attainable or would be misleading, neutron activation analysis is often employed as the second most accurate method, with it having been used to determine the yield of both Little Boy and thermonuclear Ivy Mike's respective yields.

Yields can also be inferred in a number of other remote sensing ways, including scaling law calculations based on blast size, infrasound, fireball brightness (Bhangmeter), seismographic data (CTBTO), and the strength of the shock wave.

Enrico Fermi famously made a (very) rough calculation of the yield of the Trinity test by dropping small pieces of paper in the air and measuring how far they were moved by the blast wave of the explosion; that is, he found the blast pressure at his distance from the detonation in pounds per square inch, using the deviation of the papers' fall away from the vertical as a crude blast gauge/barograph, and then with pressure X in psi, at distance Y, in miles figures, he extrapolated backwards to estimate the yield of the Trinity device, which he found was about 10 kilotonnes of blast energy.

Fermi later recalled:

The blast wave, however, was likely assumed to grow out as the surface area of the approximately hemispheric near surface burst blast wave of the Trinity gadget.
The paper is moved 2.5 meters by the wave, so the effect of the Trinity device is to displace a hemispherical shell of air of volume 2.5 m × 2π(16 km)2. Multiply by 1 atm to get an energy of  ~ 100 kT TNT.

A good approximation of the yield of the Trinity test device was obtained in 1950 by the British physicist G. I. Taylor from simple dimensional analysis and an estimation of the heat capacity for very hot air. Taylor had initially done this highly classified work in mid-1941 and published an article with an analysis of the Trinity data fireball when the Trinity photograph data was declassified in 1950 (after the USSR had exploded its own version of this bomb).

Taylor noted that the radius R of the blast should initially depend only on the energy E of the explosion, the time t after the detonation, and the density ρ of the air. The only equation having compatible dimensions that can be constructed from these quantities is

 

Here S is a dimensionless constant having a value approximately equal to 1, since it is low-order function of the heat capacity ratio or adiabatic index

 

which is approximately 1 for all conditions.

Using the picture of the Trinity test shown here (which had been publicly released by the U.S. government and published in Life magazine), using successive frames of the explosion, Taylor found that R5/t2 is a constant in a given nuclear blast (especially between 0.38 ms, after the shock wave has formed, and 1.93 ms, before significant energy is lost by thermal radiation). Furthermore, he estimated a value for S numerically at 1.

Thus, with t = 0.025 s and the blast radius being 140 metres, and taking ρ to be 1 kg/m3 (the measured value at Trinity on the day of the test, as opposed to sea-level values of approximately 1.3 kg/m3) and solving for E, Taylor obtained that the yield was about 22 kilotonnes of TNT (90 TJ). Roy. Soc. London A 200, pp. 235–247 (1950)).

 

The value of the heat capacity ratio here is between the 1.67 of fully dissociated air molecules and the lower value for very hot diatomic air (1.2), and under conditions of an atomic fireball is (coincidentally) close to the STP (standard) gamma for room-temperature air, which is 1.4. This gives the value of Taylor's S constant to be 1.036 for the adiabatic hypershock region where the constant R5/t2 condition holds.

As it relates to fundamental dimensional analysis, if one expresses all the variables in terms of mass M, length L, and time T:

 

(think of the expression for kinetic energy),

 

 

 

 

such that the left and right sides are dimensionally balanced in terms of M, L, and T (i.e., each dimension has the same exponent on both sides).

Other methods and controversy

Where these data are not available, as in a number of cases, precise yields have been in dispute, especially when they are tied to questions of politics. The weapons used in the atomic bombings of Hiroshima and Nagasaki, for example, were highly individual and very idiosyncratic designs, and gauging their yield retrospectively has been quite difficult.

Such apparently small changes in values can be important when trying to use the data from these bombings as reflective of how other bombs would behave in combat, and also result in differing assessments of how many "Hiroshima bombs" other weapons are equivalent to (for example, the Ivy Mike hydrogen bomb was equivalent to either 867 or 578 Hiroshima weapons — a rhetorically quite substantial difference — depending on whether one uses the high or low figure for the calculation).

See also
Effects of nuclear explosions — goes into detail about different effects at different yields
List of nuclear weapons

References

External links

"What was the yield of the Hiroshima bomb?"  (excerpt from official report)
"General Principles of Nuclear Explosions", Chapter 1 in Samuel Glasstone and Phillip Dolan, eds., The Effects of Nuclear Weapons, 3rd edn. (Washington D.C.: U.S. Department of Defense/U.S. Energy Research and Development Administration, 1977); provides information about the relationship of nuclear yields to other effects (radiation, damage, etc.).
"THE MAY 1998 POKHRAN TESTS: Scientific Aspects", discusses different methods used to determine the yields of the Indian 1998 tests.
Discusses some of the controversy over the Indian test yields
"What are the real yields of India's nuclear tests?" from Carey Sublette's NuclearWeaponArchive.org
High-Yield Nuclear Detonation Effects Simulator 

Yield
Energy measurement